The New York Highlanders' 1903 season was the team's first. The team was founded as a replacement in the American League for the defunct Baltimore Orioles, and was managed by Clark Griffith and played its home games at Hilltop Park (formally "American League Park"). The club was at first officially the "Greater New York" baseball club, in deference to the established New York Giants, which were based in the Polo Grounds. This was the first season for the franchise that would be later known as the now-storied New York Yankees. They finished in 4th place in the AL with a record of 72–62.

Team name 
The media dubbed the team as "Highlanders", due in part to playing at one of the highest points on Manhattan ("The Hilltop"), which was somewhat higher in altitude than the bulk of Manhattan and was considerably "uphill" from the Polo Grounds, the Giants' established home, which sat in the bottomland in Coogan's Hollow, a few blocks east and south of the Hilltop.

"Highlanders" was also originally short for "Gordon's Highlanders", a play on the name of the team President during 1903–1906, Joseph Gordon, along with the noted British military unit called The Gordon Highlanders. The club was also derisively called "Invaders" in 1903, presumably by writers favorable to the Giants.

The New York press was creative with analogous nicknames for teams. In addition to "Highlanders", the team would soon acquire the alternate nickname "Yankees", the name that would soon become official and more famous among baseball fans in the coming decades. That word is a synonym for "American" in general, and short for American Leaguers or "Americans" in this case. Given the media's penchant for citing popular culture, that nickname was also possibly influenced by the then-current and hugely popular America-centric George M. Cohan Broadway play, "Little Johnny Jones", and its centerpiece song, "Yankee Doodle Dandy". New York writers had similarly coined both the established nickname Brooklyn "[Trolley] Dodgers" and the nickname "Superbas" that the denizens of Flatbush carried for a while. As with the Highlanders, the latter was based on something unrelated, namely a circus act called "Hanlon's Superbas"; the Dodgers were managed by Ned Hanlon at that time.

Offseason 
 Prior to 1903 season: Jack O'Connor jumped to the Highlanders from the Pittsburgh Pirates.

Regular season

Season standings

Record vs. opponents

Roster

Player stats

Batting

Starters by position 
Note: Pos = Position; G = Games played; AB = At bats; H = Hits; Avg. = Batting average; HR = Home runs; RBI = Runs batted in

Other batters 
Note: G = Games played; AB = At bats; H = Hits; Avg. = Batting average; HR = Home runs; RBI = Runs batted in

Pitching

Starting pitchers 
Note: G = Games pitched; IP = Innings pitched; W = Wins; L = Losses; ERA = Earned run average; SO = Strikeouts

Other pitchers 
Note: G = Games pitched; IP = Innings pitched; W = Wins; L = Losses; ERA = Earned run average; SO = Strikeouts

Relief pitchers 
Note: G = Games pitched; W = Wins; L = Losses; SV = Saves; ERA = Earned run average; SO = Strikeouts

Notes

References 
1903 New York Highlanders team page at Baseball Reference
1903 New York Highlanders team page at www.baseball-almanac.com

New York Yankees seasons
New York Highlanders
New York Highlanders
1900s in Manhattan
Washington Heights, Manhattan